Katoa is a genus of cicadas from Southeast Asia. The type species is Katoa tenmokuensis. Formerly placed in the tribe Tibicinini, after detailed morphological analysis, in 2012 Lee placed the genus among the Cicadettini, also of the subfamily Cicadettinae. After molecular phylogenetic analysis and physical examination, in 2018 Marshal, et al., placed the genus in its own tribe, Katoini, remaining in the subfamily Cicadettinae.

Species
These six species are members of the genus Katoa:
 Katoa chlorotica Chou & Lu, 1997
 Katoa neokanagana (Liu & G.K.C., 1940)
 Katoa paucispina Lei & Chou, 1995
 Katoa paura Chou & Lu, 1997
 Katoa taibaiensis Chou & Lei, 1995
 Katoa tenmokuensis Ouchi, 1938

References

Cicadettinae
Cicadidae genera
Fauna of Southeast Asia